Blood and Diamonds is a 1978 Italian noir-poliziottesco film directed by Fernando di Leo.

Cast 
Claudio Cassinelli: Guido Mauri
Martin Balsam: Rizzo
Barbara Bouchet: Lisa
Pier Paolo Capponi: Tony
Olga Karlatos: Maria
Vittorio Caprioli: commissioner

Production
The original title for the film was Roma calibro 9. The film is very similar to Di Leo's earlier film Caliber 9, with Italian film historian and critic Roberto Curti describing it as "a reversal of Caliber 9" with the relationships in the film being contrary to each other.

The cast initially intended to include Franco Gasparri, fresh from the success of the Mark il poliziotto film series, in the main role of Guido Mauri.

Release
Blood and Diamonds premiered in Rome on 17 March 1978. The film was distributed by Titanus in Italy, the day after the kidnapping of Aldo Moro which led to the film grossing only 259,502,900 Italian lira.

See also
 List of Italian films of 1978

Notes

References

External links

1978 films
Films directed by Fernando Di Leo
Poliziotteschi films
1978 crime films
Films scored by Luis Bacalov
1970s Italian films